Beverly Boys (born July 4, 1951) is a retired diver from Canada, who represented her native country in three consecutive Summer Olympics, starting in 1968. She won a total number of three medals (two silver, one bronze) at the Pan American Games (1967 and 1971).

Boys was born in Toronto, Ontario. She won two medals (one silver, one bronze) at the 1966 British Empire and Commonwealth Games, two gold medals at the 1970 British Commonwealth Games, a gold medal and a silver medal at the 1974 British Commonwealth Games, and a silver medal at the 1978 Commonwealth Games.

Boys was inducted into the Ontario Sports Hall of Fame in 2005. She was named a Member of the Order of Canada in 2015.

Now retired, Boys resides in Vancouver, British Columbia and maintains a heavy involvement with BC Diving.

References

External links
 
 
 
 
 

1951 births
Living people
Canadian female divers
Divers at the 1968 Summer Olympics
Divers at the 1972 Summer Olympics
Divers at the 1976 Summer Olympics
Olympic divers of Canada
Divers from Toronto
Divers at the 1966 British Empire and Commonwealth Games
Divers at the 1970 British Commonwealth Games
Divers at the 1974 British Commonwealth Games
Divers at the 1978 Commonwealth Games
Commonwealth Games gold medallists for Canada
Commonwealth Games silver medallists for Canada
Commonwealth Games bronze medallists for Canada
Members of the Order of Canada
Pan American Games silver medalists for Canada
Pan American Games bronze medalists for Canada
Members of the Order of British Columbia
Commonwealth Games medallists in diving
Pan American Games medalists in diving
Divers at the 1967 Pan American Games
Divers at the 1971 Pan American Games
Medalists at the 1967 Pan American Games
Medalists at the 1971 Pan American Games
20th-century Canadian women
Medallists at the 1966 British Empire and Commonwealth Games
Medallists at the 1970 British Commonwealth Games
Medallists at the 1974 British Commonwealth Games
Medallists at the 1978 Commonwealth Games